The Denholme Clough Fault is a small fault located in Denholme, England. The fault has produced no appreciable earthquake history, but it is still subject to stresses that may cause it to slip. The maximum earthquake arising from a slip of this fault has been estimated to be below magnitude 3. The Denholme Clough Fault is part of the Pennine anticline and is partially visible from the surface.

The fault starts at Leeming alongside another and together the two faults merge and run across Thornton Moor, through Denholme and own towards Huddersfield where it is known as The Bailiff Bridge Fault.

Sources

 

Geology of West Yorkshire
Seismic faults of the United Kingdom
Geology of the Pennines
Denholme